Miska Humaloja (born 15 May 1991) is a Finnish ice hockey forward currently playing for KalPa of the Finnish Liiga.

References

External links
 

1991 births
Living people
Finnish ice hockey forwards
Hokki players
Iisalmen Peli-Karhut players
Oulun Kärpät players
People from Pyhäjärvi
Sportspeople from North Ostrobothnia